A list of films released in Soviet Union in 1974 (see 1974 in film).

1974

External links
 Soviet films of 1974 at the Internet Movie Database

1974
Soviet
Films